The ANU College of Law is the law school at the Australian National University and one of the seven academic Colleges of the ANU. It is located in Canberra, the capital of Australia. This provides the College with opportunities to connect with the work of the Parliament of Australia, the High Court of Australia, the departments and agencies of the Federal Government, as well as the local ACT law-making institutions – the Legislative Assembly and the ACT courts.

The ANU College of Law is a premier law school in Australia. It is ranked 4th nationally and equal 17th in the world according to the 2021 QS World University Rankings by Subject.

The Dean of the College is Professor Anthony Connolly.

History 
The College was established in 1960 as the Faculty of Law.

Faculty and services
The ANU College of Law is home to numerous internationally-regarded researchers and practitioners, and offers a range of undergraduate and postgraduate law programs.

The College publishes the Federal Law Review and Australian Year Book of International Law.

In addition to its academic programme, the law school promotes a range of co-curricular activities including mooting, negotiation and client interview competitions, membership of the Federal Law Review student editor board, and The ANU Law Revue.
The College has been the world champion team in the Philip C. Jessup International Law Moot Court Competition two times, in 1981 and 2010, and runner up once, in 1998.

Notable alumni

Judges
Peter Buchanan, former Justice of the Supreme Court of Victoria (8 September 2006 - 9 September 2016)
Stephen Gageler, Justice of the High Court of Australia since 2012, Solicitor-General of Australia 2008–2012
Terence Higgins, former Chief Justice of the Supreme Court of the Australian Capital Territory (2 July 1990 - 30 January 2003)
Geoff Lindsay, Judge of the Supreme Court of New South Wales, appointed 6 August 2012.
John Pascoe, AO, CVO, former Chief Judge of the Federal Circuit Court of Australia (13 October 2017 – 9 December 2018) and Deputy Chancellor of the University of New South Wales
Rachel Pepper (judge), NSW Land and Environment Court, appointed 1 May 2009. 
Richard Refshauge, Acting Judge of the Australian Capital Territory Drug and Alcohol Court since 2020, former Justice of the Supreme Court of the Australian Capital Territory (2008-2017), former Director of Public Prosecutions of the Australian Capital Territory (1998-2008)
Alan Robertson SC, former Judge of the Federal Court of Australia (2011-2020)
James Stevenson, Judge of the Supreme Court of New South Wales, appointed 1 February 2012.
Louise Taylor (jurist), Magistrate of the Australian Capital Territory since 2018, and the ACT's first Aboriginal judicial officer.
Tony Whitlam, former Justice of the Federal Court of Australia (1 January 1993 -1 May 2005)

Legal practitioners
Tupou Draunidalo, Fijian Lawyer
David Risstrom, barrister
Jennifer Robinson, human rights and WikiLeaks lawyer, Rhodes Scholar 2006

Law professors

Thomas Faunce, Professor at ANU College of Law and ANU Medical School (2006-2019)
Jeremy Gans, Professor at Melbourne Law School, expert in criminal law and animal law, and prominent Twitter personality
Mark Nolan SFHEA, Professor at ANU College of Law (2002-2020), Director of the Centre for Law and Justice, Charles Stuart University
Jane Stapleton, Emerita Professor at the [ANU College of Law], E.E. Smith Professor at Texas, Austin, 38th Master of Christ's College, Cambridge (2016–present)
James Stellios , Professor at the ANU College of Law, constitutional law expert, barrister
Phillipa Weeks, Professor at ANU College of Law (-2006), expert in labour law
Fiona Wheeler , Emerita Professor at ANU College of Law, expert in constitutional law
George Williams, Professor at the UNSW Faculty of Law, constitutional law expert

Politics and government

Concetta Fierravanti-Wells, Senator for New South Wales
Margaret Guilfoyle AC DBE, former Senator for Victoria
John Hannaford, former New South Wales Government Minister 
Bob Hawke, 23rd Prime Minister of Australia
Gary Humphries, former Senator for the Australian Capital Territory
Kate Jones, former Queensland Government Minister
Joe Ludwig, Senator for Queensland
John McMillan AO, Australian Information Commissioner
Brett Mason, Senator for Queensland
Nick Minchin, former Senator for South Australia
Simon Overland APM, Tasmanian Justice Department Secretary, 23rd Chief Commissioner of Victoria Police 
Shane Rattenbury, Member of the ACT Legislative Assembly
Warwick Smith AM, former Member of the Australian Parliament
Jon Stanhope, former Chief Minister of the ACT, Administrator of the Australian Indian Ocean Territories
Shane Stone AC, QC, 5th Chief Minister of the Northern Territory
Feleti Teo OBE, former Secretary General of the Pacific Islands Forum
Andrew Tink, former Member of the Legislative Assembly of New South Wales
Tony Whitlam QC, former Member of the Australian Parliament, former judge 
Peter Woolcott, Australian diplomat

Other

James Popple , CEO of the Law Council of Australia
Stephen Rice, journalist
Tim Rogers, musician 
Anu Singh, criminal
Graham Tuckwell, Founder and Chairman of ETF Securities Limited
Jack Waterford AM, Editor-at-Large of The Canberra Times

See also
 Priestley 11

References

External links 
ANU College of Law Website

Australian National University
Law schools in Australia
Educational institutions established in 1960
1960 establishments in Australia